TechWeek was a bi-weekly technology magazine owned by Metro States Media, a company headquartered in Sunnyvale, California. It had a controlled circulation of about 100,000. Its audience was people in the Silicon Valley who were interested in technology. It regularly featured a comic strip by Rudy Park.

History
The magazine began in 1998. Tim Graham, the editor-in-chief, said that the magazine created a large following in its reader base but never managed to establish the same connection with our advertisers

On November 27, 2000, the magazine published its final issue and announced that publication was ceasing. Graham said that several factors, including the migration of advertising to the internet, the failure to invest enough funds in advertising, and "bad timing" caused it to close. The magazine used technologically advanced advertising methods funded with $4 million, but did not make money from them.

References

External links
 TechWeek (Archives)

1998 establishments in California
2000 disestablishments in California
Biweekly magazines published in the United States
Defunct magazines published in the United States
Magazines established in 1998
Magazines disestablished in 2000
Magazines published in the San Francisco Bay Area
Science and technology magazines published in the United States